The Fujifilm FinePix HS50EXR is a DSLR styled ultra-zoom bridge camera announced by Fujifilm on January 7, 2013. It is the last model of the Fujifilm FinePix HS series. At the time of its release, it competed most closely with the Canon PowerShot SX50 HS, another ultra-zoom bridge camera with raw capability. The SX50 has 20% longer maximum effective focal length, but the HS50 has 33% more resolution on the sensor.

Features 
Photographic Functions

 Weight: 636 g (1.402 lb)
 Size: 5.16 x 3.82 x 4.96 inches
 Sensor: 16 megapixel 1/2.3-inch EXR-CMOS
 Sensitivity: ISO 100 to 12,800
 Shutter speed: 30 – 1/4000 s (extremes depending on exposure mode)
 Electronic level
 Histogram display
 Focus check, Focus peaking in Manual focus mode
 Framing guideline
 Film simulation
 Advanced filter: Toy Camera / Miniature / POP COLOR / High-Key / Low-Key / Dynamic Tone / Partial Color / Soft Focus
 Advanced modes: Pro focus, Pro low light, Multiple exposure
 Fujinon 42x optical zoom lens, manually actuated (no motor delay)
 Focal length: f=4.4–185mm, equivalent to 24–1000mm on a 35mm camera
 Aperture: f/2.8–11 (wide) f/5.6–11 (telephoto)
 Still images: RAW (.raf) or JPEG
 Storage: SD, SDHC, or SDXC memory cards.
 Flash: Built in pop-up and external hot shoe
 Auto Red-eye removal
 Monitor: Fully articulating 920k pixel 3-inch LCD screen
 Exposure compensation: −2 to +2 EV at 1/3 intervals, in P, S, A, C modes.
 Exposure bracketing: ±1/3 to 1 EV in P, S, A, M and C modes.
 Connections: USB 2.0, mini HDMI, A/V (NTSC and PAL)
 Lens filter mount: 58 mm
 Sweep panoramas are taken in one long exposure with Motion Panorama 360.
 Dynamic range: Has three settings of DR100, DR200 and DR400.
 Continuous shooting modes:
 Continuous shooting at 11 fps
 Best frame capture: fires the shutter continuously prior to shutter release when half pressing the shutter button after focus is achieved.
 Zoom bracketing

Video Functions 

 FHD video: up to 1080p at 60 frame/s with stereo audio. Duration limited to 29 minutes or 4 GB (whichever comes first).
 High speed video capture (aka slo-mo) with frame rates up to 1,000 fps

 Movie format: Apple MOV H.264 video codec
Stereo audio track recorded through two microphones
 Manual Focusing
 Microphone-level adjustment
 External microphone input

https://commons.wikimedia.org/wiki/Category:Taken_with_Fujifilm_FinePix_HS50EXR

https://commons.wikimedia.org/wiki/Category:Photos_by_Clem_Rutter_using_a_Fujifilm_FinePix_HS50_EXR

References
http://www.dpreview.com/products/fujifilm/compacts/fujifilm_hs50exr/specifications
Fujifilm
HS50EXR
Cameras introduced in 2013
Superzoom cameras